Grit, Grits, or Gritty may refer to:

Food 
 Grit (grain), bran, chaff, mill-dust or coarse oatmeal
 Grits, a corn-based food common in the Southern United States

Minerals 
 Grit, winter pavement-treatment minerals deployed in grit bins
 Grit, or gastrolith, swallowed abrasive substances with roles in digestion 
 Gritstone, category of sedimentary rock 
 Shell grit, dietary calcium source in birds

Abrasive technologies 
 Grit, one of the byproducts of grinding, an abrasive machining process
 Grit removal, the removal of grit, the coarse abrasive material in untreated sewage
 Grit size table, fineness/coarseness classification of sandpaper grit, and compares the CAMI and "P" designations with the average grit size in micrometres (µm)

Art and entertainment 
 Grit (film), a 1924 American silent film starring Clara Bow
 Grit (newspaper), a magazine, formerly a weekly newspaper
 Grit (Transformers), a Micromasters Decepticon - Constructor Squad character
 Grit (TV network), an American digital multicast television network
 Grit (Martyn Bennett album), a 2003 album by Martyn Bennett
 Grit (Madrugada album), a 2002 album by Norwegian band Madrugada
 GRITS, a hip hop duo from the United States

People with the name 
 Grit Boettcher (born 1938), German actress
 Grit Breuer (born 1972), former German athlete
 Diederik Grit (1949–2012), Dutch translator and translation scholar
 Grit Haid (1900–1938), Austrian stage and film actress
 Grit Hammer (born 1966), retired German shot putter
 Grit Hegesa (1891–1972), German dancer and silent film actress
 Grit Jurack (born 1977), former German handball player
 Grit Lehmann (born 1976), professional female volleyball player
 Grit Müller (born 1972), retired German swimmer
 Grit Naumann (born 1966), retired German female volleyball player
 Grit Šadeiko (born 1989), Estonian heptathlete
 Grit Slaby (born 1965), German swimmer

Places 
 Grit, Texas, USA
 Grit, Virginia, USA

Other uses
 Grit (personality trait), a positive non-cognitive trait
 GRIT, the RICS (gene), a protein in humans
 Grits, a former pet of  US president Jimmy Carter
 Gritty (mascot), NHL mascot of the Philadelphia Flyers since 2018
 Clear Grits, 19th-century political movement
 Liberal Party of Canada, colloquially referred to as the Grits
 GRITS, the new universal tolling system soon to be adopted in the Greek motorway system

See also
Steve Gritt (born 1957), British footballer
Franklin Gritts (1915-1996), American artist
 Nitty-gritty (disambiguation)
 True Grit (disambiguation)

German feminine given names